History Repeating may refer to:

 "History Repeating" (Brothers and Sisters)., an episode of the TV series Brothers and Sisters
 "History Repeating" (The Vampire Diaries), an episode of the TV series The Vampire Diaries
 "History Repeating" (song), a 1997 recording by Propellerheads featuring Shirley Bassey
 History Repeating: Blue, an album by The Megas